The Chinese Club is a private member's club in Central, Hong Kong. When it was first founded, its members were exclusively Chinese, many of whom served as compradors in Western mercantile firms.

History
The Chinese Club was established in 1897 by Tse Tsan-tai (謝纘泰 or 謝贊泰), an Australian-born social and political reformer, merchandiser and reporter, whose stated vow was to overthrow the Qing dynasty by force.  At the time of its founding, Chinese (or part Chinese) men were barred from joining the prestigious, whites-only Hong Kong Club, irrespective of their social or business standing in the community.

Tse, together with Cheung Tsoi, Luk King-fo and Leung Lan-fan, decided to found a parallel club for Chinese to meet and socialise, and to raise funds from wealthy local businessmen for the revolutionary cause. At the time, Tse knew many local business leaders who were sympathetic to the cause, such as Robert Ho Tung.

Ho Tung became the club's first chairman, the effect of which was to project a softer, less revolutionary image in the minds of the Hong Kong Police, thereby reducing the likelihood of a raid by authorities.

Originally located on Wyndham Street, the club moved to Queen's Road. From the 1920s until 1964, it was housed on the top floor of the Bank of Canton Building at 6 Des Voeux Road Central (opposite Prince's Building). The Club moved into its own premises in 1967.

Membership
Originally, the membership was open to "any Chinese man" (this included Eurasians). Membership is now open to "all persons of Chinese origin".

The Chinese Club Building
The Clubhouse building at 21–22 Connaught Road Central opened on 1 February 1967.

The Club created a building fund in 1927. Two adjacent three-storey buildings were purchased on 30 November 1940. One building was sold during the Japanese occupation to pay off outstanding debts.

In the 1960s, construction of a neighbouring building compromised the pilings underneath the Club's building, forcing the Government to declare it as condemned. The Club then built a new 17-storey Clubhouse and sold the basement and first three floors of the building to pay off the construction mortgages.

The Club currently owns 12 floors of the Chinese Club Building. The 8th to the 15th floors house the Club's facilities.

References

External links

 The Chinese Club

Dining clubs
Clubs in Hong Kong